Tennis was contested at the 1958 Asian Games in New National Tennis Courts, Tokyo, Japan from May 25 to May 30, 1958. Tennis had doubles and singles events for men and women, as well as a mixed doubles competition.

A total of 60 tennis players from 15 nations competed in tennis at the 1958 Asian Games, Japan and the Philippines dominated the events winning all five gold and silver medals.

Medalists

Medal table

Participating nations
A total of 60 athletes from 15 nations competed in tennis at the 1958 Asian Games:

See also
 Tennis at the Asian Games

References

 Asian Games Roll of Honour (1958-2006)

External links
 OCA website

 
1958 Asian Games events
1958
Asian Games
1958 Asian Games